Sreedharan is one of the names of the Hindu deity Vishnu. It is used as a male given name in India and the Indian diaspora. People with that name include:
 N. Sreedharan, One of the chief organisers of Communist Party in Central Travancore and former CPI(M) Secretariat Member
 E. Sreedharan, popularly known as metro man, engineer known for heading Delhi Metro and repairing Pamban Bridge
 Kottarakkara Sreedharan Nair, Malayalam actor
 Perumbadavam Sreedharan, Malayalam author

Indian given names